This is a list of the members of the Academy of Athens, the national academy of Greece.

List

 1926 (Founding Members)
 
 
 
 
 
 Georgios Remoundos (1878–1928)
 
 
 
 
 
 
 
 
 
 Georgios Hatzidakis (1843–1941)
 
 Panagiotis Kavvadias
 Christos Tsountas (1857 – 1934)
 Kostis Palamas (1859 –1943)
 Georgios Jakobides (1853 –1932)
 
 Konstantinos Amantos
 Georgios Drossinis (1859 – 1951)
 
 
 Antonios Keramopoulos (1870 –  1960)
 
 
 
 Anastasios Orlandos  (1887 – 1979)
 Archbishop Chrysostomos I of Athens  (1868 –  1938)
 Konstantinos Raktivan  (1865 – 1935)
 
 Nikolaos Politis (1872 –1942)
 
 
 
 Constantin Carathéodory (first elected member) (1873 –1950)

 1927
 Georgios Streit
 

 1928
 
 
 Alexandros Mazarakis-Ainian

 1929
 
 
 
 
 
 
 

 1931
 Gregorios Xenopoulos
 
 
 

 1932
 

 1933
 
 
 
 

 1934
 

 1935
 

 1936
 
 Konstantinos Dimitriadis

 1938
 Zacharias Papantoniou
 

 1939
 Stylianos Lykoudis
 Archbishop Chrysanthus of Athens

 1940
 

 1941
 

 1942
 

 1945 
 
 Alexandros Diomidis
 Gregorios Papamichael
 Epameinondas Thomopoulos
 
 
 Manolis Kalomiris

 1946
 

 1947
 
 Panagiotis Poulitsas

 1948
 Chariton Charitonidis

 1949
 
 

 1950
 Dionysios Kokkinos

 1951
 

 1952
 
 Xenophon Zolotas

 1954
 

 1955
 Georgios Athanasiadis-Novas
 
 
 
 
 Jean Spiropoulos
 Spyridon Marinatos
 Christos Karouzos

 1956
 Leonidas Zervas

 1957
 Elias Venezis

 1958
 
 Stratis Myrivilis

 1959
 Panagiotis Kanellopoulos
 
 
 

 1960
 
 
 
 Konstantinos Papaioannou
 Ioannis Theodorakopoulos

 1961
 Konstantinos Tsatsos

 1962
 

 1963
 

 1965
 

 1966
 
 
 
 
 
 Dimitris Pikionis
 Dionysios Zakythinos

 1967
 

 1968
 
 Michael Tombros
 Michail Stasinopoulos
 

 1969
 

 1970
 George E. Mylonas
 
 
 
 
 Panagiotis Zepos

 1973
 
 

 1974
 Nikos Hadjikyriakos-Ghikas
 
 Angelos Terzakis
 Constantine Trypanis
 
 

 1976
 
 

 1977
 
 
 
 Pandelis Prevelakis
 

 1978
 
 

 1979
 Ioannis Toumbas
 

 1980
 
 Manolis Hatzidakis
 
 
 
 

 1981
 
 

 1982
 Manousos Manousakas
 
 

 1983
 
 
 

 1984
 Pavlos Sakellaridis
 Konstantinos Despotopoulos
 
 
 
 

 1985
 

 1986
 
 
 Tasos Athanasiadis

 1987
 Nikiforos Vrettakos
 

 1989
 
 
 

 1990
 
 

 1991
 Chrysanthos Christou
 

 1992
 

 1993
 
 Panayiotis Tetsis
 Panos Ligomenidis
 John Zizioulas, Metropolitan of Pergamos
 Markos Siotis

 1994
 Charalambos Antoniadis
 
 
 Konstantinos Grollios

 1995
 Athanasios Panagos

 1996
 
 

 1997
 
 Dimitri Nanopoulos
 , first woman member
 Dimitrios Trichopoulos
 

 1998
 
 Angeliki Laiou

 1999
 Iakovos Kambanellis
 Antonios Kounadis

 2000
 Panagiotis Vokotopoulos
 
 
 Georgios Parissakis
 

 2001
 

 2002
  
 Kiki Dimoula
 
 

 2003
 Nicholas Ambraseys
 
 

 2005
 Stamatios Krimigis
 
 
 

 2006
 Lucas Papademos

 2007
 
 

 2008
 
 Dimitris Mytaras

 2010
 Anna Benaki-Psarouda
 Konstantinos Vagenas

 2011
 Stephanos Imellos
 Haralambos Roussos
 
 Yiannis Parmakelis
 
 Michalis Tiverios
 

2013
 George Kollias
 Theodoros Papanghelis
 

2014
 Nikiforos Diamandouros
 Theodore Antoniou

2015
 
 Christopher Pissarides

2016
 
 Vassilis Rapanos
 Angelos Delivorrias
 Emmanuel Gdoutos

2017
 
 
 Emmanouil Korres

2018
 Alexander Nehamas

2020
 Paschalis Kitromilides

2021
 
 
 Antonia Trichopoulou

References

External links
 

Academy of Athens Members
 List
Academy
Academy
Acaademy of Athens